George Hartley may refer to:

 George Hartley (cricketer, born 1909) (1909–1992), English cricketer
 George Hartley (cricketer, born 1849) (1849–1909), English cricketer
 George Hartley, lynched in Tennessee, 1922